Marianne Denicourt (née Cuau; born 14 May 1963) is a French actress, director and screenwriter who has appeared in more than 50 films and television productions since 1986.

She studied under Patrice Chéreau in 1985-86 at the Ecole du Théâtre des Amandiers in the western Paris suburb of Nanterre.

Filmography

Theatre

References

External links

 
 

1966 births
Living people
French film actresses
French television actresses
Actresses from Paris
20th-century French actresses
21st-century French actresses
French women film directors
French women screenwriters
French screenwriters
French stage actresses